USS Josephine has been the name of more than one United States Navy ship, and may refer to:

 , later USS SP-913, a patrol vessel in commission from 1917 to 1918
 , a patrol vessel in commission from 1917 to 1918
 , a patrol vessel in commission from 1918 to 1919

See also
 

United States Navy ship names